Nubra may refer to:

 Nubra Valley, in the Jammu and Kashmir region
 Nubra River, in the Jammu and Kashmir region
 Nubra (Vidhan Sabha constituency)
 Nubra pika (Ochotona nubrica), a mammal